The Morning News may refer to:

 ITV Morning News, in the United Kingdom, former name of ITV News at 5:30
 Morning News (Canadian morning TV show), in Canada
 The Morning News (online magazine)
 The Morning News (American newspaper), in Florence, South Carolina
 "The Morning News" (song), a 2007 single by Chamillionaire
 The Dallas Morning News
 CBS Morning News, a half-hour daily television broadcast on the American TV network
 The Morning News, a predecessor of The News Journal, a newspaper in Delaware